The spade-toothed whale (Mesoplodon traversii) is a very little-known species, the rarest species of beaked whale. It was first named from a partial jaw found on Pitt Island, New Zealand, in 1872; reported and illustrated in 1873 by James Hector (referring it to M. layardii), and described as a new species the next year by John Edward Gray, who named it in honor of Henry Hammersley Travers, the collector. This was eventually lumped with the strap-toothed whale, starting as early as an 1878 article by Hector, who never considered the specimen to be specifically distinct. A calvaria found in the 1950s at White Island, also New Zealand, initially remained undescribed, but was later believed to be from a ginkgo-toothed beaked whale.

In 1993, a damaged calvaria was found washed up on Robinson Crusoe Island, Chile, and was described as a new species, Mesoplodon bahamondi or Bahamonde's beaked whale.

In December 2010, two specimens, a cow and calf, were found stranded on Opape Beach, Bay of Plenty, New Zealand. They were originally thought to be Gray's beaked whale, but later genetic analysis revealed that they represented the first complete specimens of the spade-toothed whale. Following this find, a report describing the spade-toothed whale and an analysis of their DNA later appeared in the 6 November 2012 issue of the journal Current Biology.

The results of DNA sequence and morphological comparisons have shown all three finds came from the same species, which is therefore properly known as M. traversii. The external appearance was only described in 2012, and it is likely to be the most poorly known large mammalian species of modern times.

Because of where these specimens were initially located at, it is assumed that the remaining population of M. traversii lives solely in the South Pacific.

Physical description
Until 2012, nothing was known about this species other than cranial and dental anatomy. Some differences exist between it and other mesoplodonts, such as the relatively large width of the rostrum. Its appearance might be most similar to an oversized ginkgo-toothed beaked whale in overall shape, as their skulls are quite alike except in size. The distinguishing characters are the very large teeth, close in size to those of the strap-toothed whale. The teeth are much wider than those of the strap-toothed, and a peculiar denticle on the tip of the teeth present on both species is much more pronounced in the spade-toothed whale. It is believed that only the males obtain the jutted denticle and that it smoothens over time due to aggressive behavior with other males. The common name was chosen because the part of the tooth that protrudes from the gums (unlike the strap-like teeth of strap-toothed whales) has a shape similar to the tip of a flensing spade as used by 19th-century whalers.

Despite the rather similar dentition, the spade-toothed whale and strap-toothed whale seem to be only distantly related. The present species' relationships are not known with certainty, though, because this species is very distinct morphologically, and the DNA sequence information is contradictory and is currently not good enough to support a robust phylogenetic hypothesis. The only known complete specimens are a 5.3-m (17.4-ft) adult female and her 3.5-m (11.5-ft) male calf. The cow was spindle-shaped, with a triangular dorsal fin with a concave trailing edge set about two-thirds the way back. It was dark gray or black dorsally and white ventrally, with a light thoracic patch created by a diagonal band that extends from behind the eye downwards and back to the dorsal fin. It also has a dark eye patch, rostrum, and flippers.

Ecology and status
This species has never been seen alive, so nothing is known of its behavior. It is presumably similar to other medium-sized Mesoplodon, which are typically deep-water species living alone or in small groups and feeding on cephalopods and small fish. Following a year long gestation period, the young probably become independent of their mothers at about one year of age, as is the case in most whales, with roughly a 73% chance of survival past year one.

The population status of the spade-toothed whale is entirely unknown.

Conservation
The spade-toothed whale is covered by the Memorandum of Understanding for the Conservation of Cetaceans and Their Habitats in the Pacific Islands Region (Pacific Cetaceans MOU). The species' IUCN Red List conservation status is "Data Deficient (DD)" due to lack of information and uncertain data.

Specimens

 NMNZ 546 – 1872; Pitt Island specimen, apparently male, probably fully adult
 Auckland University School of Biological Sciences MacGregor Collection (unnumbered) – 1950s White Island specimen, probably fully adult
 Chilean National Museum of Natural History 1156 – 1986; Robinson Crusoe Island specimen, probably fully adult
 Auckland University School of Biological Sciences MacGregor Collection 2010; Opape Beach specimen, adult female with male calf.

The sex of the 20th-century specimens is not known. By recovering or failing to recover DNA sequences of the Y chromosome, it could, in theory, be resolved. Little material is shared between the Pitt Island specimen and the calvariae, making direct anatomical comparisons problematic.

See also

List of cetaceans

References

Further reading

External links
 Whale & Dolphin Conservation Society (WDCS)

Mesoplodont whales
Mammals described in 1874
Taxa named by John Edward Gray